Karel Senecký (17 March 1919 – 28 April 1979) was a Czech football forward who played for Czechoslovakia in the 1938 FIFA World Cup. He also played for AC Sparta Prague.

In the season 1937–38 he moved to Yugoslavia and became manager of Hajduk Split.

Fifa World Cup Career

References

External links
 Profile at the ČMFS website
 

1919 births
Czech footballers
Czechoslovak footballers
Czechoslovakia international footballers
1938 FIFA World Cup players
AC Sparta Prague players
1979 deaths
Expatriate footballers in Yugoslavia
Expatriate football managers in Yugoslavia
Association football forwards
Czechoslovak football managers
HNK Hajduk Split managers